Norwood station is a SEPTA train station on the Wilmington/Newark Line.  While on tracks owned by the company, Amtrak trains do not stop here, as it is served only by SEPTA. The line offers southbound service to Marcus Hook, Wilmington and Newark, Delaware and northbound service to Philadelphia and points beyond (most commonly Norristown). The station, located at Winona & Welcome Avenues in Norwood, Pennsylvania, includes a 62-space parking lot on its outbound platform side (along Harrison Avenue).  Pedestrian walkways and staircases connect the inbound and outbound platforms via the Amosland Road Bridge, which overpasses the tracks. Opposite the tracks from the SEPTA designated parking lot is metered street and lot parking.

The station opened on September 1, 1875, as part of the Philadelphia, Wilmington and Baltimore Railroad. The depot lasted until May 11, 1950, when a fire burned the structure. The depot was razed on September 25, 1951, over a year later.

Station layout
The station's inbound platform and ticket office is located next to the Norwood Public Library, a branch of the Delaware County Library System. Norwood has two low-level side platforms with walkways connecting passengers to the inner tracks. Amtrak's Northeast Corridor lines bypass the station via the inner tracks.

References

External links
SEPTA - Norwood Station
Original Norwood PB&W (Philadelphia, Baltimore and Washington) Station image
 Amosland Road entrance from Google Maps Street View
 Winona Avenue entrance from Google Maps Street View

SEPTA Regional Rail stations
Stations on the Northeast Corridor
Railway stations in Delaware County, Pennsylvania
Railway stations in the United States opened in 1875
Wilmington/Newark Line